The British Institute of Interior Design (BIID) is a professional organisation for commercial and residential interior designers in Britain. The current president of the institute is Lester Bennett.

Establishment
Founded in 1965 as the Interior Decorators and Designers Association, it merged in 2002 with the UK chapter of the International Interior Design Association becoming the British Interior Design Association. In 2009, the Secretary of State awarded it Institute status, and became the British Institute of Interior Design. In 2013, it subsumed the Interior Design Association, a business association representing interior designers working in the commercial sector.

Conduct
The BIID aims to promote professionalism in interior design and to this end has published jointly with the Royal Institute of British Architects (RIBA) the standard form of designer's appointment, ID/05 (updated as ID/10). The Institute has also sponsored the publication of The BIID Interior Design Job Book (also with the RIBA), the first book to set out the procedures for managing an interior design project.

Associations
The BIID is the only interior design body which is a member of the Construction Industry Council the umbrella body for  professional organisations in the construction industry. It is also a UK Trade & Investment (UKTI) Design Partner, the government body promoting British services abroad and a member of the International Federation of Interior Architects/Designers, the umbrella body for interior designers worldwide. It is also a member of The Foundation for Science and Technology, a body which provides a platform for debate of policy issues that have a science, engineering or technology element.

References 

Professional associations based in the United Kingdom
Organizations established in 1966
 
1966 establishments in the United Kingdom

es:Instituto Británico de Diseño de Interiores